The qualification for the 2014 UEFA Women's Under-19 Championship were a series of association football matches between national teams to determine the participants of the 2014 Final Tournament held in Norway.

All times are CEST (UTC+02:00).

Qualifying round
The 48 teams were divided into 11 groups of four teams, with each group being contested as a mini-tournament, hosted by one of the group's teams. After all matches have been played, the 11 group winners and 10 best runners-up will advance to the Second qualifying round.

The draw was made on 20 November 2012 at UEFA headquarters in Nyon.

Norway qualified as hosts, while England, Spain and Germany received byes to the second round as the sides with the highest coefficients.

The first round matches were played between 21 and 26 September 2013.

Seeding
Seeding for the pots of the draw was based on the qualifying matches of the past three seasons with some bonus points for final tournament results. The hosts of the eleven mini-tournament groups are annotated with an H.

Tiebreakers
Tie-breakers between teams with the same number of points are:
 Higher number of points obtained in the matches played between the teams in question
 Superior goal difference resulting from the matches played between the teams in question
 Higher number of goals scored in the matches played between the teams in question
If now two teams still are tied, reapply tie-breakers 1–3, if this does not break the tie, go on.
 Superior goal difference in all group matches
 Higher number of goals scored in all group matches
 Drawing of lots

Group 1

Group 2

Group 3

Group 4

Group 5

Group 6

Group 7

Group 8

Group 9

Group 10

Group 11

Ranking of second-placed teams
To determine the ten best second-placed teams from the qualifying round, only the results of the second-placed teams against the winners and the third-placed in each group are taken into account.

The following criteria are applied to determine the rankings:
higher number of points obtained in these matches
superior goal difference from these matches
higher number of goals scored in these matches
fair play conduct of the teams in all group matches in the second qualifying round
drawing of lots

Elite round
England, Spain and Germany received byes to the second round as the sides with the highest coefficients. Defending champions France were narrowly eliminated in the second round.

Format
24 team are drawn into six groups of four. The teams then play each other once. After that the group winners and the best runner-up advance to the final tournament.

The draw was held on 20 November 2013 in Nyon.  Teams were seeded based on their first round performances. The hosts of the six mini-tournament groups are indicated below in italics.

{| class="wikitable"
|-
! width=170|Pot A
! width=170|Pot B
! width=170|Pot C
! width=170|Pot D
|-
|
|
|
|

Tiebreakers
Tie-breakers between teams with the same number of points are:
 Higher number of points obtained in the matches played between the teams in question
 Superior goal difference resulting from the matches played between the teams in question
 Higher number of goals scored in the matches played between the teams in question
If now two teams still are tied, reapply tie-breakers 1–3, if this does not break the tie, go on.
 Superior goal difference in all group matches
 Higher number of goals scored in all group matches
 Drawing of lots

Group 1

Group 2

Group 3

Group 4

Group 5

Group 6

Ranking of second-placed teams
To determine the best second-placed team from the qualifying round, only the results of the second-placed teams against the winners and the third-placed in each group are taken into account.

The following criteria are applied to determine the rankings:
higher number of points obtained in these matches
superior goal difference from these matches
higher number of goals scored in these matches
fair play conduct of the teams in all group matches in the second qualifying round
drawing of lots

Ireland advanced as best runners-up to the final tournament. Defending champions France and top seeded Germany were eliminated in this stage.

References

External links
UEFA.com

Qualification
2014
Women's Under-19 Championship qualification
2013 in women's association football
2014 in women's association football
2014 in youth sport